Let's Cook! is an album by guitarist Barney Kessel recorded at sessions in 1957 but not released on the Contemporary label until 1962.

Reception

The Allmusic review by Scott Yanow states: "Throughout, Kessel keeps with the other all-stars, swinging hard while paying tribute to the legacy of Charlie Christian".

Track listing
 "Let's Cook" (Barney Kessel) - 11:18
 "Time Remembered" (Vernon Duke) - 4:15
 "Just in Time" (Jule Styne, Betty Comden, Adolph Green) - 4:57
 "Tiger Rag" (Original Dixieland Jazz Band) - 9:50
 "Jersey Bounce" (Tiny Bradshaw, Eddie Johnson, Bobby Plater, Buddy Feyne) - 9:30 
Recorded at Contemporary's studio in Los Angeles on August 6, 1957 (tracks 4 & 5) and November 11, 1957 (tracks 1-3)

Personnel
Barney Kessel - guitar
Frank Rosolino - trombone (tracks 4 & 5)
Ben Webster - tenor saxophone (tracks 4 & 5)
Victor Feldman - vibraphone (tracks 1-3)
Hampton Hawes (tracks 1-3), Jimmy Rowles (tracks 4 & 5) - piano
Leroy Vinnegar  - bass
Shelly Manne - drums

References

Contemporary Records albums
Barney Kessel albums
1962 albums